Magnus Eriksson (born 12 August 1973) is a Swedish former professional ice hockey goaltender. He has played with Milano Vipers since 2004. Before that did he represent Augsburger Panther in the Deutsche Eishockey Liga (2001–2004), Färjestads BK in the Swedish Elite League (2000–2001), VIK Västerås HK in the Swedish Elite League (1997–2000).Now he plays for the French elite hockey team Dragons de Rouen. Before signing with Västerås IK in 1997 did he play in the lower leagues in Sweden.

He won a gold medal at the 1998 IIHF World Championships.

External links

1973 births
Living people
People from Haninge Municipality
VIK Västerås HK players
Färjestad BK players
Augsburger Panther players
HC Milano players
EC Red Bull Salzburg players
SønderjyskE Ishockey players
Rouen HE 76 players
Swedish ice hockey goaltenders
Swedish expatriate sportspeople in Austria
Swedish expatriate ice hockey players in Denmark
Swedish expatriate sportspeople in France
Swedish expatriate sportspeople in Italy
Sportspeople from Stockholm County